John David Sewell (7 July 1936 – 19 November 2021) was an English professional footballer who had a long career in the Football League, before continuing as player and coach in the North American Soccer League (NASL) during the 1970s. Nicknamed "The Duke" for his good dress sense, Sewell also had the distinction of never having been booked during his English playing career and only once throughout his entire playing career.

A well-rounded young athlete, Sewell played fly-half at rugby so well that he was twice selected to play for England Schools’ Under 15 team.  On leaving school, he first became a sprinter with Blackheath Harriers, and then signed as a “professional footballer” for Bexleyheath & Welling in 1954.

A key man at centre-half in the Kent League team at Bexleyheath, Sewell was transferred to Charlton Athletic on January 5, 1955.  Almost immediately, he spent two years in national service, and finally made his league debut at right-half against Sheffield Wednesday in January 1957, a year in which the club struggled (and ultimately failed) to avoid relegation from the First Division.  After not making the first team the following season, he was named again to the squad at Christmas, 1958 – this time at full-back, a position he played for the rest of his career.

Sewell made 204 first team appearances for Charlton, scoring 5 goals, before signing for London rivals Crystal Palace on October 25, 1963.  Between 1963 and 1971, he made 258 appearances for Palace, scoring nine goals, mainly from the penalty spot.  He became club captain in 1967-68, when Alan Stephenson left to join West Ham, and in 1969, led Palace to the First Division for the first time in the club’s history.  

In 1970, his last season with Palace, he scored his best remembered goal in the closing seconds of a Division One match against league leaders Leeds United.  The visitors were a goal up when the ball came to Sewell, thirty yards from goal, who chose to hit a speculative lob back into the penalty area.  The Leeds goalkeeper, Gary Sprake, caught the ball at the goal line, and then inexplicably dropped it behind him into his own net.  

In 1971, Sewell received a testimonial for his services to Palace, against Belgian club RFC Bruges.  It was his last game in a Palace shirt.  That same year, he joined an exodus of players leaving Selhurst Park to join their former coach George Petchey at Leyton Orient.  After just one season, however, he left for America to play in the fledgling North American Soccer League for the St. Louis Stars (later the California Surf, based in Anaheim), where he stayed as player and coach for eight years.  In 1975, he was named NASL Coach of the Year, for his success guiding a St. Louis squad comprised almost exclusively of home-grown American players, an oddity in the era of Pelé, Franz Beckenbauer, and other high-priced imports.

His soccer career at a close, Sewell stayed in California for almost thirty years, before retiring to Washington state in 2006. He died in Sequim, Washington on 19 November 2021.

References

External links
 
 NASL stats
 

1936 births
2021 deaths
Footballers from Brockley
English footballers
Association football defenders
Charlton Athletic F.C. players
Crystal Palace F.C. players
Leyton Orient F.C. players
St. Louis Stars (soccer) players
English Football League players
North American Soccer League (1968–1984) players
English football managers
North American Soccer League (1968–1984) coaches
Expatriate soccer managers in the United States
English expatriate sportspeople in the United States
Expatriate soccer players in the United States
English expatriate footballers